Diana Carolina Bazalar Alava (born 13 March 1995) is a Peruvian athlete specialising in the sprint hurdles. She has won multiple medals on regional level.

Her personal bests are 13.25 seconds in the 100 metres hurdles (+0.5 m/s, Lima 2019) and 8.51 seconds in the 60 metres hurdles (Cochabamba 2020).

International competitions

References

1995 births
Living people
Peruvian female hurdlers
Athletes (track and field) at the 2019 Pan American Games
Pan American Games competitors for Peru
21st-century Peruvian women